is a former sumo wrestler from Kitahiyama, Hokkaidō, Japan. He made his professional debut in July 1964, and reached the top division in March 1972. His highest rank was sekiwake. He retired in May 1979 and was active elder in the Japan Sumo Association under the name Kimigahama. As Kimigahama-oyakata he first coached at Kokonoe stable, but moved to Hakkaku stable when it was started up by former Kokonoe wrestler Hokutoumi (the 61st Yokozuna) in 1993. He reached the Sumo Association's mandatory retirement age of 65 in July 2013. The Kimigahama toshiyori-kabu (or elder name) was acquired by Hakkaku wrestler Okinoumi in October 2013.

Career record

See also
Glossary of sumo terms
List of past sumo wrestlers
List of sumo tournament second division champions
List of sekiwake

References

1948 births
Living people
Japanese sumo wrestlers
Sumo people from Hokkaido
Sekiwake
Kokonoe stable sumo wrestlers